Albert Baldauf (December 6, 1917 – October 25, 1991) was a German politician of the Christian Democratic Union (CDU) and former member of the German Bundestag.

Life 
Since 1952, Baldauf was a co-founder of the then still illegal CDU of the Saarland and worked for the return of the Saarland to the Federal Republic of Germany. In 1957 he became chairman of the Saarlouis district CDU association. Baldauf was a member of the German Bundestag from 1957 to 1965. He represented the constituency of Saarlouis-Merzig in parliament. He was then a member of the Saarland Landtag (1965-1970). From 1956 to 1964 Baldauf was mayor of Wallerfangen.

Literature

References

1917 births
1991 deaths
Members of the Bundestag for Saarland
Members of the Bundestag 1961–1965
Members of the Bundestag 1957–1961
Members of the Bundestag for the Christian Democratic Union of Germany
Members of the Landtag of Saarland
Recipients of the Saarland Order of Merit